This is a bibliography for the history of rail transport in Ireland.

Company histories 
35 Years of NIR 1967 to 2002 - Allen, Jonathon M - 2003, 
A History of Northern Ireland Railways - Robb, William - 1982
Ballymena Lines, The - Patterson, Edward M. - 1968, 
 
 
Bessbrook & Newry Tramway, The - Newham, Alan T. - 1979
 
Cork & Macroom Direct Railway, The - Creedon, Colm - 1960
Derry Central Railway, The - McIlfatrick, James - 1987
 
Dublin & Blessington Tramway, The - Fayle, Harold - 1963
Dublin & Lucan Tramway, The - Newham, A.T. - 1964
Dublin & South Eastern Railway, The - Shepherd, Ernie - 1974, 
 
 
Dundalk Newry & Greenore Railway, The - Barrie, D.S.M. - 1957
 
 
Forty Shades Of Steam - Cassells, Joe - 2004, 
Giant's Causeway, Portrush & Bush Valley Railway & Tramway Co. Limited - McGuigan, John - 1983, 
Giant's Causeway Tramway, The - McGuigan, J.H. - 1964, 
 
 
 
 
 
 
 
Hill of Howth Tramway, The - Flewitt, R.C. - 1968
Ireland's First Railway - Murray, Kevin A. - 1981, 
Listowel & Ballybunion Railway, The - Newham, A.T. - 1989, 
Lough Swilly Railway, The - Patterson, Edward M. - 1988, 
 
NCC Centenary celebrations - LMS (Northern Counties Committee) - 1948
Northern Counties Railway Vol. 1, The - Currie J.R.L. - 1973, 
Northern Counties Railway Vol. 2, The - Currie J.R.L. - 1974, 
On the Move Córas Iompair Éireann 1945 - 95 - O'Riain, Michael - 1995, 
Portstewart Tramway, The - Currie, J.R.L. - 1968
 
Sligo Leitrim & Northern Counties - Sprinks, N.W. - 1981

 
Waterford & Tramore Railway, The - Fayle, Harold - 1972, 
Tralee & Dingle Railway - Whitehouse, P.B.

Biographies 
Fifty Years of Railway Life in England, Scotland and Ireland - Tatlow, Joseph - 
Hard Lines: A Damned Close Run Thing - Alexander, Bob - 1989, Lurgan, County Armagh:Inglewood Press
Man of No Property - Andrews, C.S. - 2001, 
 
 
The Man from the Railway - McNally, James P. - 1992, 
William Martin Murphy - Morrissey, Thomas - 1997, 
William Trail - Brown, Martin - 1995,

Locomotives and trains 
101 Class Locomotives of the GS&WR - Flanagan, P.J. - 1966
 
Administration (CIE) - Institute of Public Administration - 1968
"All Change" The Social Impact of the Railways - Ulster Folk & Transport Museum - 2004, 
ABC Irish Locomotives 1949 - Ian Allan - 2000, 
Bulleid and the Turf Burner - Shepherd, Ernie - 2004, 
By Rail Through The Heart Of Ireland - O'Farrell, Padraic - 1990, 
Centenary Booklet - Permanent Way Institution - 1984
Customs Requirements Traffic from Great Britain to the Irish Free State and Northern Ireland - Railway Clearing House - 1935
Derry Road, The - Fitzgerald, J.D. - 1995, 
Diesel Dawn - Flanagan, Colm - 2003, 
Ireland Hand Book of Railway Distances - Browning, Walter - 1884
Ireland's Railway Heritage - Ryan, Gregg - 2002, 
Irish Industrial and Contractors' Locomotives - Cole, D. - 1962
Irish Commercial & Railway Gazetteer, The - Leggatt, J.E. - 1879
Irish Locomotives and Rolling Stock - Irish Traction Group - 1997, 
Irish Metro Vick Diesels - Carse, Barry - 1996, 
Irish Narrow Gauge, The - Prideaux, J.D.C.A. - 1981, 
Irish Narrow Gauge In Colour, The - Johnston, Norman - 2003, 
Irish Narrow Gauge Railways - Baker, Michael H.C. - 1999, 
Irish Narrow Gauge Scale Drawings - Lloyd, David - 1988, 
 
 
Irish Railway Album - Boocock, C.P. - 1968, 
Irish Railway Collection, The - Ulster Folk & Transport Museum - 1994, 
Irish Railway Collection, The - Ulster Folk & Transport Museum - 1993, 
 
Irish Railways in Colour - Ferris, Tom - 
Irish Railways in Colour A Second Glance - Ferris, Tom - 1995, 
Irish Railways in Pictures No 1 GNR(I) - Irish Railway Records Society London Area - 1976
Irish Railways in Pictures No 2 MGWR - Irish Railway Records Society London Area
Irish Railways in Pictures No 3 Cork - Irish Railway Records Society London Area - 1976, 
Irish Railways in Pictures No 4 Giants Causeway - Pollard, Mike - 2000, 
Irish Railways in the heyday of steam - Casserley, H.C. - 
Irish Railways Past & Present Vol 1 - Baker, Michael H.C. - 1995, 
 
Irish Railways Today, Pender, Brendan & Herbert Richards - 1967
Irish Railways Traction & Travel - Irish Traction Group

 
 
Irish Trams - Kilroy, James - 1996, 
Ironing the Land - O'Connor, Kevin - 1999, 
LMS in Ireland, The - Kennedy, Mark - 2000, 
Locomotive & Train Working in the Latter Part of the Nineteenth Century - Ahrons, E.L. - 1954
Locomotives & Railcars of Bord Na Mona - Johnson, Stephen - 1996, 1857800451
Locomotives & Rolling Stock of Irish Rail and Northern Irish Railways - Doyle, Oliver - 1987, 
 
 
 
 
Narrow Gauge Railways of Ireland - Fayle, Harold - 1946
Narrow Gauge Railways of Ireland - Kidner, R.W. - 1971
 
Northern Ireland Tours & Excursions - Ulster Transport Authority - 1949
Off the Beaten Track - Cronin, Kevin - 1996, 
Off The Rails - Ogle, Brendan - 2003, 
 
 
Railway Age in Ireland, The - Ulster Folk & Transport Museum - 1994, 
Railway Age in Ireland, The - Ulster Folk & Transport Museum - 
Railway History: Ireland Volume 1 - McCutcheon, Alan - 1969, 
Railway History: Ireland Volume 2 - McCutcheon, Alan - 1969, 
Railway Lines of CIE & NIR - Doyle, Oliver & Stephen Hirsch - 1985
 
Railway Policy on the Right Rails? - CIE - 1986
Railways in Ireland 1834 - 1984 - Doyle, Oliver & Stephen Hirsch - 1983
Share issues of the Great Southern Railway of Ireland - Jenkins, Peter R. - 1997, 
Some Industrial Railways of Ireland - McGrath, Walter - 1959
State Railways for Ireland - Fabian Society - 1908
Station Masters, The - Ryan, Gregg - 2000
Steam Age In Ireland, The - O'Neill, The Lord - 2004, 
Steam at Mallow - Yearbook of the Great Southern Railway Preservation Society - 1984
Steam at Mallow - Yearbook of the Great Southern Railway Preservation Society - 1986/87
Steam's Last Fling - Stevenson, Michael R - 2000, 
Sunny Side of Ireland, The - Great Southern & Western Railway - 1895
Tables for calculating rates between places in Great Britain and Places in Ireland - Railway Clearing House - 1927
Taisteal agus Iompair in Eirinn - Mac Giolla Chomhaill	Anraí - 1974
Transport in Ireland 1880 - 1910 - Flanagan, Patrick - 1969
Transport Preservation in Ireland 1980/81 - Parks, David - 1980
Transport Preservation in Ireland 2005 - McGlynn Parks, David - 2005

Philatelic 
An Post Dublin Belfast - 2005
Irish TPOs, Their History and Postmarks - Ward, C.W.

Local history 

A Nostalgic Look at Belfast Trams since 1945 - Maybin, Mike - 
 
Along UTA Lines - Ulster's Rail Network In The 1960s - Sinclair, Ian McLarnon - 2002, 
Athlone Railway 1851 - 2001 - Gately, Bridie - 2001
 
Belfast & County Down Railway An Irish Railway Pictorial, The - Coakham, Desmond - 1998, 
Belfast Corporation Tramways, 1905 - 1954 - Maybin, J.M. - 1981, 
Belfast's Lost Tramways - Maybin, Mike - 2003, 
Bellevue Express, The - McFetridge, Stewart - 1995
Bygone Days on Fermanagh Railways - Love, Kevin - 2003
Call Us Back To Donegal - Piercy, John - 2000, 
Cavan & Leitrim Railway An Irish Railway Pictorial, The - Ferris, Tom - 1997, 
Cavehill Waggon Line, The - McFetridge, Stewart - 1999
Claremorris to Collooney Railway - Swinford Historical Society - 1996
Connemara Railway, The - Villiers Tuthill, Kathleen - 2003
Cork City Railway Stations, 1985, Colm Creedon, 1986
Cork and Macroom  Direct Railway (the) Colm Creedon, 1960 (out of print)
County Armagh Railway Album - McKee, Eddie - 1996
County Down, The - Arnold, R.M. - 1981
Crossing The Boyne: the Great Viaduct 1855 - 2005 - Share, Bernard - 2005, 
Dingle Train, The - Rowlands, David - 1996, 
Down Line - Belfast & County Down Railway Museum Trust - 1999, 
Down Memory Line - Hamilton, Michael - 1997, 
Fermanagh's Railways - Friel, Charles P. - 1998, 
Fintona Horse Tram, The - Johnston, Norman - 1992, 
G.A.A. Excursion Trains, Colm Creedon 1984
Gone but not forgotten Belfast Trams 1872 - 1954 - Railway Preservation Society of Ireland & Irish Transport Trust - 1980
Harcourt Street Line - Back On Track - Mac Aongusa, Brian - 2003, 
Howth and her trams - Kilroy, James - 1986, 
Human Frailty and the 1871 Ballymacarrett Rail Accident - Haines, Keith - 2002
Lartigue, The - Guerin, Michael - 1989,  
Last years of the Wee Donegal 1950-59, The - Robotham, Robert - 1998, 
Londonderry & Lough Swilly Railway, The - Boyd, J.I.C. - 1981, 
Londonderry & Lough Swilly Railway A visitors guide, The - Bell, Dave - 
Londonderry & Lough Swilly Railway An Irish Railway Pictorial, The - Flanders, Steve - 1997, 
Lost Railways of Co. Antrim - Johnson, Stephen - 2002, 
Lost Railways of Co. Cork - Johnson, Stephen - 2005, 
Lost Railways of Co. 'Derry - Johnson, Stephen - 2002, 
Lost Railways of Co. Down and Co. Armagh - Johnson, Stephen - 2002, 
Lost Railways of Co. Dublin and the South East - Johnson, Stephen - 2005, 
Lost Railways of Co. Co. Tyrone and Co. Fermanagh - Johnson, Stephen - 2002, 
Main Line Railways of Northern Ireland - McCormick, W.P. - 1948
Newry Railways in Pictures, The - McKee, Eddie - 1994
Rails Around Belfast - Crockart, Andrew - 2004, 
Rails Around Dublin - Murray, Donal - 2002, 
Rails to Achill - Beaumont, Jonathan - 2002, 
 
Railway Days in Strabane - Strabane WEA - 
Railway Engineering Works - CIE
Railway Town, The - McQuillan, JackRailways Around County Armagh - McKee, Eddie - 1990
Railways in Ulster - Morton, Grenfell - 1989 - 
Railways of Ireland Past and Present Dublin, The - Baker, Michael H.C. - 1997, 
Railways of Northern Ireland and their Locomotives, The - McCormick, W.P. - 1946
Reflections on Munster Railways - Limerick Museum - 1984
Rules and Regulations GNR(I) - 1914
Rules and Regulations GS&WR - 1927
Runaway Train, The - Currie, J.R.L. -1971, 
Sligo Leitrim & Northern Counties Railway An Irish Railway Pictorial - Sprinks, Neil - 2001 - 
Standard Gauge Railways in the North of Ireland - Morton, R.G. - 1965
Steam Locomotives Of The Ulster Transport Authority - Pue, R.J.A. - 1997, 
Story of the Drumm Battery Train, The - Ring, RoddyThree Foot Gauge Railways of Northern Ireland - Kidner, R.W. -	1950
Through Streets Broad and Narrow - Corcoran, Michael - 2000, 
 
Through the Hils of Donegal - Carroll, Joe - 
Tours in North of Ireland - Belfast & Northern Counties Railway - 1893
Train to Howth, The - Hurley, Michael J. - 1996
Tralee & Dingle Railway, The - Rowlands, David G. - 1977, 
Trams to the Hill of Howth - Kilroy, James - 1998, 
Turf Burner, The - Ireland's Last Steam Locomotive Design - Rowledge, J.W.P. - 1972
Twenty Five Years Gone - Pue, R.J.A. - 1975 - 
Ulster from the Carriage Window - Robb, William - 1986
Ulster Tramways & Light Railways - McNeill, D.B. - 1956
UTA Train Signalling regulations - Ulster Transport Authority - 1952
Warrenpoint Branch, The - Fitzgerald, Des - 1996, 
Wee Donegal Revisited, The - Robotham, Robert - 2002, 
West Clare Railway, The - Taylor, Patrick - 1994, 
West Clare Railway - An Irish Railway Pictorial, The - Taylor, Joe - 2002, 
When the Train Came to Mullingar - 1998
Works, The - Ryan, Gregg - 1996
Works "Open Day", The - Irish Rail - 1996

 General (with some Irish interest) 
Atmospheric Railways - Hadfield, Charles - 1967
British & Irish Tramways since 1945 - Waller, Michael HBrowne and Theobalds Law of Railways - 1899
Father Browne's Trains and Railways - O'Donnell, E.E. - 2004, 
Institution of Mechanical Engineers Proceedings - Institution of Mechanical Engineers - 1888
Light Railways of Éire IOM and Channel Islands, The - Kidner, R.W. - 1949
Railway Accidents of Great Britain and Europe - Schneider, Ascanio - 1968, 
Railways And The State, The - Pim, Frederic - 1912
Railways of Great Britain and Ireland - Whishaw, Francis - 1969, 
Through the Cities - Barry, Michael - 1991, 

 General Irish (with some railway interest) 
Civil Engineering Heritage Ireland - Cox, Ron C. - 1998, 
Ireland's Bridges - Cox, Ron - 2003, 
Industrial Archaeology of County Down, The - Green, E.R.R. - 1963
Industrial Archaeology of Northern Ireland, The - McCutcheon, W.A. - 1980, 
Industrial Archaeology of Cork City & its Environs, The - Rynne, Colin - 1999, 
Industrial Heritage of North-East Ireland - Industrial Heritage Association of Ireland - 2002, 
Lagan Valley 1800 1850, The - Green, E.R.R. - 1949
Power from Steam - Industrial Heritage Association of Ireland - 1998, 
Rail versus Road in Ireland 1900 - 2000 - Collins, Michael - 2000 - 
Road versus Rail - Greer, P.E.Shane's Castle Railway and Nature Reserve - Barzilay, David - 1975
Transport in Ards Borough in the 20th Century - McDonald, Brian - ????

 Reports (excluding company annual reports) 
A Review of Railway Safety in Ireland - International Risk Management Services - 1998
A Review of Railway Safety in Ireland: Implementation Review - International Risk Management Services - 2000
A Review of Railway Safety in Ireland: Summary - International Risk Management Services - 1998
Accident Report: Hilden - HMSO - 1985, 
Cahir Rail Accident Report - Grimes, Michael - 2003
CDRRS Business Plan - Tee, NeilDublin LRT EIS	- CIE
Dublin LRT EIS Line A - CIE
Ecological Report on Barnagh Tunnel - GST Ltd - 2002
Joint Committee on State Sponsored Bodies: CIE	- Government Publications Office - 1979
LUAS Advisory Group 3rd Report
LUAS Advisory Group 4th Report
LUAS Advisory Group 5th Report
LUAS Advisory Group 6th Report
Report on The Railroad Constructed From Kingstown To Dalkey in Ireland Upon The Atmospheric System - Mallet, Robert - 1844
Report On Transport In Ireland - 1948
Strategic Rail Review - Booz Allen Hamilton - 2003, 
Western Rail Corridor - West on Track - 2004

 Maps 
A Railway Atlas of Ireland - Hajducki, S Maxwell - David and Charles - 1974, 
Johnsons Atlas and Gazetteer of the Railways of Ireland - Johnson, Stephen - 1997, 
National Atlas Showing Canals Navigable Rivers Mineral Tramroads Railways and Street Tramways Ireland - Crowther, G.L. - 1989, 
Official Railway Map of Ireland, Emslie, J and Emslie, W - Railway Clearing House - 1897
Official Railway Map of Ireland, ''''Emslie, J and Emslie, W - Railway Clearing House - 1902
Official Railway Map of Ireland - Railway Clearing House - 1918
Rail Atlas Great Britain & Ireland - Baker, Stuart K - 1996, 
Railway Clearing House Junction Diagrams - Railway Clearing House - 1915
Railway Track Diagrams Ireland - Yonge, John - 2004, 
W & A K Johnston's Map Of The Railway Systems Of Ireland - W & AK Johnston - 1914

Society journals 
"An Mhuc Dubh" (1–5). Cumann Traenach Gaeltacht Láir. 1993–1997.
"Five Foot Three". The Railway Preservation Society of Ireland. 1965–.
"The Irish Mail". The Irish Traction Group. 1989–.
"The Journal of the Irish Railway Record Society". Irish Railway Record Society. 1946–.

Irish Railway News (Southern Railways) 
Irish Railway News 2.1, 2.2, 2.3, 2.4 - 1994
Irish Railway News 3.1, 3.2, 3.3 - 1995
Irish Railway News 4.1, 4.2 - 1996
Irish Railway News 5.1 - 1997
Irish Railway News 6.1 - 1999

Notes

Transportation bibliographies
Bibliography, Rail Transport in Ireland